The North Wall Arts Centre (often just referred to as the North Wall) is a performing arts centre in Oxford, owned by St Edward's School and shared with the city. It houses a 200-seat  theatre, plus a rehearsal space, dance studio and a visual art gallery. The arts centre hosts touring theatre companies, musicians and other public events, as well as events by the school, with the aim to provide facilities and arts events both for St Edward's students and for the public at large.

In 2017, John Hoggarth and Ria Parry were appointed as co-directors of the North Wall, replacing Lucy Maycock, who had been the Artistic Director since September 2010.

History
The North Wall Arts Centre was built on the site of a Victorian swimming pool, which was the oldest swimming pool in the country, situated on the grounds of St Edward’s School. The name derives from an ancient stone boundary wall that runs the entire length of the public street elevation. Designed by Haworth Tompkins architects, the project cost more than £3.5 million and won several major architectural awards, including a RIBA in 2008. It also received a Certificate from the Oxford Preservation Trust in recognition of its "significant contribution to the conservation and improvement of Oxford’s built environment." Completed in 2006, The North Wall was officially opened to the public in 2007 with a three-week arts festival.

Programs
In addition to hosting School events, The North Wall Arts Centre runs a regular programme of public arts events, as well as a Summer Festival in July and a residential drama school in August. It attracted various theatre companies including Birmingham Repertory Theatre, ATC Theatre, Out of Joint, Bush Theatre and Theatre Alibi. It has welcomed  some musical acts, as French-Irish chanteuse Camille O'Sullivan, John Tavener, The Unthanks and Spiers and Boden. Comedians who have appeared at The North Wall include Eddie Izzard, Sarah Millican, John Bishop, and Rhod Gilbert. The theatre also hosts jazz evenings, ballets, children’s shows, contemporary and classical concerts, cabaret, opera, and new exhibitions in the modern gallery every three weeks.

Plays performed
2007
Great Expectations by Charles Dickens, [[St Edward'school
Noises Off by Michael Frayn
Mr. Vertigo by Edward Kemp
The Birthday Party by Harold Pinter
A Midsummer Night's Dream by Shakespeare, St Edward's School, Oxford

2008
The Tempest by Shakespeare, Tomahawk Theatre Company
Good by Cecil Philip Taylor, St Edward's School, Oxford
Hysteria, Inspector Sands, Stamping Ground Theatre
Wit by Margaret Edson, Oxford Theatre Guild
Zero by Chris O'Connell, Theatre Absolute
Mile End by Dan Rebellato, Analogue
Another Kind of Silence by Liz Rothschild, Full Circle Productions
The Count of Monte Cristo by Alexandre Dumas and Joel Horwood, West Yorkshire Playhouse
Shoot/Get Treasure/Repeat by Mark Ravenhill, Royal Court Theatre, Out of Joint, Paines Plough
Infinite Lives by Chris Goode, The North Wall Arts Centre
Cider With Rosie by Laurie Lee and Nick Darke, Bristol Old Vic Theatre School
50 Ways to Leave Your Lover, Bush Theatre
Hedda Gabler by Henrik Ibsen, Tomahawk Theatre Company
Our Country's Good directed by Lucy Maycock, Ralph Clark Theatre
The Hothouse, directed by Simon Roche, Lush Theatre
Two by Jim Cartwright, Hull Truck
Measure for Measure by Shakespeare, Creation Theatre Company

2009
Henry V by Shakespeare, St Edward's School, Oxford
Dreams of Violence by Stella Feehily, Out of Joint, Soho Theatre
John Moran...and his neighbour, Saori by John Moran, Saori Tsukada
The American Pilot by David Greig, Oxford Theatre Guild
Anima, North Wall Arts Centre
Traces, The National Youth Theatre, Paines Plough
Tess of the D'Urbervilles, adapted by Michael Fry,  Bristol Old Vic Theatre School
Gaslight by Patrick Hamilton, Tomahawk Theatre Company
Paperweight, directed by Jamie Wood, Top of the World
Lost in the Wind, Lost Spectacles
Beef by John Godber, Hull Truck
River's up by Alex Jones, Oxfordshire Touring Theatre
Whiter Than Snow by Mike Kenny, Graeae Theatre Company
Amadeus by Peter Shaffer, Oxford University
Pandora 88, directed by Andrew Dawson, Fabrik Company
The Importance of Being Earnest by Oscar Wilde, Tomahawk Theatre Company

2010
Sweeney Todd: His Life, Times and Execution, directed by Alexander Parsonage, Finger in the Pie
A View From the Bridge by Arthur Miller, Oxford Theatre Guild
Ivan and the Dogs by Hattie Naylor, Soho Theatre
John Moran and Saori (in Thailand) by John Moran, Saori Tsukada
The Author by Tim Crouch, News from Nowhere
Tiny Volcanoes by Laurence Wilson, Paines Plough
My Name is Sue by Dafydd James, Notebook
The Great British Country Fete by Russell Kane, Bush Theatre
David Copperfield, Bristol Old Vic Theatre School
Certain Dark Things, direct Emily Watson Howes, You need me
Eurydice by Sarah Ruhl, Acting Touring Company
Crush by Paul Charlton, Tristan Bates Theatre
Cling To Me Like Ivy by Samantha Ellis, Birmingham Repertory Theatre
The Colour of Nonsense directed by Andy Hay, Forkbeard Fantasy

2011
A Christmas Carol by Charles Dickens, Creation Theatre Company
Stalag Happy by Edward Elks and Dan Frost, Third Man Productions
I, Malvolio by Tim Crouch
A Delicate Balance by Edward Albee, Oxford Theatre Guild
The Golden Dragon by Roland Schimmelpfennig, Drum Theatre Plymouth
Bang Bang Bang by Stella Feehily, Octagon Theatre Bolton
Bunny by Jack Thorne, Nabokov
Epic by David Luff, Foster and Dechery
The Big Smoke, Theatre Ad Infinitum
Keepers directed by Simon Day, The Plasticine Men Director
After the Accident by Julian Armistead, REM Projects
Goucher's War by Nikki Sved, Theatre Alibi

2012 
The Government Inspector by Nikolai Gogol, Oxford Theatre Guild
Yellow Moon by David Greig, Citizens Theatre
The Odyssey, The Paper Cinema
Rapunzel, Theatre of Widdershins
The Barber of Seville, Opera Up Close
Dead On Her Feet by Ron Hutchinson, director Barry Kyle
Mad About the Boy, Iron Shoes Company
So Comedy Night, with Tom Rosenthal
Minsk 2011: A Reply to Kathy Acker, Belarus Free Theatre
Mayday Mayday by director Katy Carmichael, Theatre Damfino
Translunar Paradise by W. B. Yeats, Theatre Ad Infinitum
Crave by Sarah Kane, Acting Touring Company
DNA by Dennis Kelly, Hull Truck
Snookered by Ishy Din Tamasha, Oldham and Bush Theatre

See also
St Edward's School, Oxford

References

External links

Arts centres in England
Theatres in Oxford
Buildings and structures completed in 2006